Stottesdon is a village and civil parish in south east Shropshire, England. The parish of Stottesdon covers a large rural area and extends over the village of Chorley. The village is situated near the market towns of Cleobury Mortimer and Bridgnorth.

History
St. Mary's Church (the oldest building in Stottesdon) is pre-Norman with parts that may date at 450 CE, although the bulk of the church is post-Norman. The churchyard contains the war graves of 3 British soldiers of World War I.

Facilities
Stottesdon has a primary school st Mary’s C of E primary school, a public house the fighting cocks and post box.

Notable people
Trevor Meredith (b.1936), professional footballer for Burnley and Shrewsbury Town.

See also
Listed buildings in Stottesdon

References

External links

The Stottesdon Parish Portal
 Stottesdon in Domesday Reloaded
Stottesdon C of E Primary School
Chorley Family Playgroup at Stottesdon School
Friends of Stottesdon Primary School

Civil parishes in Shropshire
Villages in Shropshire